A general election was held in the U.S. state of South Carolina on November 3, 2020. 

To vote by mail, registered South Carolina voters must have requested a ballot by October 30, 2020. As of early October, some 481,602 voters requested mail ballots.

State offices

State Senate

State House of Representatives

Federal offices

President and vice president of the United States

U.S. Senate

U.S. House of Representatives

See also
Political party strength in South Carolina
Politics of South Carolina
 Elections in South Carolina

References

Further reading

External links

 

 
 
  (State affiliate of the U.S. League of Women Voters)
 . ("Deadlines, dates, requirements, registration options and information on how to vote in your state")
 

 
South Carolina